Fantail are birds of the genus Rhipidura and subfamily Rhipidurinae.

Fantail may also refer to:

 Fantail (goldfish), a breed of goldfish
 Fantail (pigeon), a breed of domestic pigeon 
 Fantail (album), a 2002 album by Merzbow
 Windmill fantail, a little windmill - the "fan" - mounted at right angles to the sails at the rear ("tail") of a windmill's cap to bring them automatically into the wind

Aircraft and seacraft
 Fantail (ship), an overhanging stern design on some ships
 Fenestron (Fantail), a helicopter anti-torque system based on a ducted fan
 Lavochkin La-15 "Fantail", an early Soviet jet fighter
 Landing Vehicle Tracked "Fantail", codename during the Italian campaign in World War II

See also
 Tail fan (disambiguation)